The Meyenburg Prize is awarded for outstanding achievements in cancer research by the Meyenburg Foundation in support of the German Cancer Research Center, Heidelberg (DKFZ), which is the largest biomedical research institution in Germany.  The prize has been awarded annually since 1981, and currently has an honorarium of €50,000.

List of Recipients 
Source: Meyenburg Award Winners

 1981 Werner W. Franke
 1982/1983 Holger Kirchner and 
 1984 Lutz Gissmann
 1985 Volker Sturm
 1986 Karin Mölling
 1987 Mary Osborn
 1988 Elisabeth Gateff
 1989 
 1990 
 1991 Hans-Georg Rammensee
 1992 Walter Birchmeier
 1993 Johannes Gerdes
 1994 
 1995 David P. Lane
 1996 Peter H. Krammer
 1997 Patrick S. Moore and Yuan Chang
 1998 Richard D. Wood
 1999 Carl-Henrik Heldin
 2000 Matthias Mann
 2001 
 2002 Andrew Fire
 2004 Erich A. Nigg
 2005 Thomas Tuschl
 2006 Elizabeth Blackburn
 2007 Shinya Yamanaka
 2008 Hans Clevers
 2009 Brian Druker
 2010 Alan Ashworth
 2011 Stefan Hell
 2012 Charles Mullighan
 2013 Nathanael Gray
 2014 Peter Campbell (Sanger Institute)
 2015 
 2016 Emmanuelle Charpentier
 2017 Nitzan Rosenfeld (Cancer Research UK Cambridge Institute)
 2019 Benjamin L. Ebert

See also

 List of biomedical science awards

References

External links
 

German science and technology awards
Cancer research awards
Lists of award winners
Awards established in 1981